The PENABUR Christian Educational Board (Badan Pendidikan Kristen PENABUR, also known as BPK PENABUR or Simply ‘’’PENABUR’’’) is a body of private Protestant schools under the Indonesian Christian Church (GKI) of the West Java Synod in Indonesia. BPK PENABUR has schools in 15 cities which are in four provinces: West Java, DKI Jakarta, Banten and Lampung. Those 15 cities are Jakarta, Bandung, Cimahi, Cirebon, Bogor, Serang, Bandar Lampung, Metro, Cicurug, Sukabumi, Rengasdengklok, Indramayu, Jatibarang, Cianjur and Tasikmalaya. BPK PENABUR's vision is "To become a Christian educational institution superior in Faith, Knowledge, and Service." Its mission is "To optimally develop the students' potential through quality education and teaching based on Christian values." BPK PENABUR covers education levels including preschool, primary school, middle school, high school and a Sekolah Menengah Kejuruan in Pharmaceutics. There are PENABUR international schools in Jakarta and Bandung. As part of its identity, BPK PENABUR has its own march composed by J. Haryanto S. mars bpk penabur

History

Pre-1950
The History of BPK PENABUR is strongly linked to the Gereja Kristen Indonesia of the West Java Synod (then named Tiong Hoa Kie Tok Kauw Hwee Khu Hwee Djabar - THKTKHKH Djabar) which has already existed since the Dutch colonial era. The THKTKHKH Synod of West Java is one of the parties that were trusted by the missionary institutions of the Dutch to take over part of the educational institutions that they left behind after the end of Dutch rule over Indonesia. This trust is then responded to quickly by the Synod in a session held on 28 May 1948 in Bandung by forming a committee responsible for taking crucial steps to open Christian schools. Said committee then acquired the support of Rev. Pouw Peng Hong, a pioneer of an independent movement of churches in West Java. With the Reverend's support, the committee became more vigorous in their efforts, especially in acquiring funds and support from teachers to realize their hopes of building a Christian school under the THKTKHKH Synod of West Java.
The efforts from the Committee finally had some results. In the years 1948–1950, the committee (renamed into the School Committee) successfully built 4 evening schools using the old missionary institution's school buildings. The 4 schools are Christian Primary Schools (SDK) which are located at 29 Pintu Besi St, Tanah Njonja St (now Gunung Sahari St), Oranjeplein St (now Slamet Riyadi St), and 11 Sluisbrugstraat St (now Pintu Air St). In contrast to the Christian schools in Jakarta which focus more on educating and involve more teachers, the Christian schools in Bandung concentrate more on building faith and involve reverends.

1950s: The founding of BP THKTKHKH West Java
After the Round Table Conference, the important figures of the Synod started intensely thinking about the condition of the schools under their custody in Indonesia. Finally, after a series of meetings, the School Committee and the important figures of the Synod agreed to found Badan Pendidikan THKTKHKH (BP THKTKHKH) Djabar. According to a Notarial Deed composed by H. J. J. Lamers in Bandung, represented by Notary Tan Eng Kiam, BP THKTKHKH of West Java is thereby founded and separated from the church. The institution then starts organizing and appointing management. The first president of BP THKTKHKH Djabar was Ong Teng Houw, the secretary was Liem Boen Liong, and the treasurer was Lie Bo Tay. During the founding, BP THKTKHKH Djabar's assets were spread in six cities; Jakarta (5 compounds), Bandung (3 compounds, 2 shared with Gereja Kristen Pasundan), Cirebon, Sukabumi, Jatibarang, and Indramayu. The central office of BP THKTKHKH Djabar was also moved to Jakarta from Bandung following the restoration of Jakarta as the capital city.

1950-1968: The development of BP THKTKHKH Djabar and its renaming to BPK Djabar
During this period, BP THKTKHKH Djabar started expanding to fulfill its goal of building Christian schools. The construction of schools had started spreading to other cities, even those where BP THKTKHKH Djabar hadn't been established yet. In 1953, BP THKTKHKH Djabar pioneered a school in Tasikmalaya which would later become BPK PENABUR Tasikmalaya, followed by BP THKTKHKH Cianjur in 1955, Bogor in 1958, Cimahi in 1961, and then Metro in 1967.
Alongside its expansion efforts, BP THKTKHKH Djabar started improving the schools in the original 6 cities. In 1951, Dutch missionaries donated a sum of money to the Christian Kindergarten-Primary school (TKK-SDK) in Kebonjati. 4 years later, in 1955, a new Christian Primary school was built in Guntur St located in Bandung, followed by a Christian Junior High School in Jenderal Sudirman St also in Bandung. To complement the Kindergartens, Primary Schools, and Junior High Schools previously built, the institution built an Assistant Pharmacist School, which is now a Pharmacy Vocational High School. In July 1965, BP THKTKHKH Djabar also opened its first Senior High School(SMA) in Kosambi St in Bandung whose first principal was Drs. Kwee Hok Gwan. This Senior High School will eventually be named SMAK 1 BPK PENABUR Bandung (BPK PENABUR Bandung Christian Senior High School 1).
In 1956, the Komite Sekolah (School Committee) was transformed and renamed to Komite Pembantu Setempat (KPS) (Local Assistance Committee). The board members of this committee were members of the THKTKHKH church. An independent KPS in Bandung was established later on in 1959. In 1967, BP THKTKHKH Djabar officially renamed itself to Jajasan Badan Pendidikan Kristen Djawa Barat (BPK Djabar) as stated under Notarist Act No. 33 dated 27 January 1967, issued by Notarist E. Pondaag. As a result of the renaming, BPK Djabar is now open to all ethnic groups in Indonesia and is based on Christian values.

1968-1989: The development of BPK Djabar and its renaming to BPK PENABUR
After renaming itself to BPK Djabar, the institution kept expanding to more cities. In 1975, BPK Djabar Bandar Lampung was officially established, followed by BPK Djabar Rengasdengklok in the same year. The year after, BPK Djabar Cicurug was also established. In 1989, BPK Djabar Serang was established. In other cities, the schools in each city grow faster and faster, with the KPS of each city building more and more school complexes of different education levels.
The spread of BPK Djabar to other cities as well as its goal to sow the seeds of Christian education to other cities influenced the management of BPK Djabar to rename itself to BPK PENABUR (literally meaning 'sower') in 1989 as stated in Act no. 121, issued by Notarist Wiryomartani S.H. This event reached Berita Negara Republik Indonesia (National News of the Republic of Indonesia) edition 36, with the name being officially adopted on 1 July 1989, during the GKI Jawa Barat 46th Synod General Assembly.

1989-present: BPK PENABUR
Since 1989, BPK PENABUR has experienced a rapid growth. As of 2010, BPK PENABUR manages 135 schools across Indonesia, including a few PENABUR International Schools and a Vocational High School.

References 

Schools in Indonesia
Schools in Bandung
Education in Banten
Education in Lampung
Schools in Jakarta